The women's 3000 metres race of the 2015–16 ISU Speed Skating World Cup 1, arranged in the Olympic Oval, in Calgary, Alberta, Canada, was held on 13 November 2015.

Martina Sáblíková of the Czech Republic won the race, while Irene Schouten of the Netherlands came second, and Natalya Voronina of Russia came third. Misaki Oshigiri of Japan won the Division B race.

Results
The race took place on Friday, 13 November, with Division B scheduled in the morning session, at 09:00, and Division A scheduled in the afternoon session, at 12:30.

Division A

Note: NR = national record.

Division B

Note: NR = national record, NRJ = national record for juniors.

References

Women 3000
1